The table below lists the 100 largest census subdivisions (municipalities or municipal equivalents) in Canada by population, using data from the 2021 census for census subdivisions.

This list includes only the population within a census subdivision's boundaries as defined at the time of the census. Many census subdivisions are part of a larger census metropolitan area or census agglomeration. For their ranking, see the list of census metropolitan areas and agglomerations in Canada.

A city is displayed in bold if it is a provincial or federal capital (Ottawa), and in italics if it is the most populous city in the province. Three territories and one province—Yukon, Northwest Territories, Nunavut (all territories) and Prince Edward Island (a province)—do not have municipalities among the 100 most populous in Canada.



See also
 List of the largest cities and towns in Canada by area
 List of the largest population centres in Canada
 List of largest Canadian cities by census
 List of census metropolitan areas and agglomerations in Canada
 Population of Canada by year
 Population of Canada by province and territory

References

Demographics of Canada
Canada municipalities
Municipalities